Commando is a 1985 American action film directed by Mark L. Lester and starring Arnold Schwarzenegger, Rae Dawn Chong, Alyssa Milano, Vernon Wells, Bill Duke and Dan Hedaya. The film was released in the United States on October 4, 1985. The film was noted for its furious action and sense of humor.

The film was nominated for a Saturn Award for Best Special Effects but lost to Back to the Future. The film's score was provided by James Horner. A commercial success, Commando was the 7th-highest-grossing R-rated film of 1985 worldwide, and the 25th-highest-grossing overall.

Plot
Retired US Army Colonel John Matrix is informed by his former superior Major General Franklin Kirby that all the other members of his former unit have been killed by unknown mercenaries. The mercenaries, among them Bennett, an ex-member of Matrix's team discharged for excessive violence, attack Matrix's secluded mountain home and kidnap his young daughter Jenny. 

While trying to intercept them, Matrix is tranquilized and abducted by the mercenaries. He is taken before their commander, Arius, a former South American dictator Matrix removed from power. Arius blackmails Matrix into carrying out a political assassination in his home country of Val Verde, where he wishes to lead a military coup. With Jenny's life on the line, Matrix seemingly agrees to fulfill the demand. After boarding a plane, a DC-10-10 operated by Western Airlines from Los Angeles Airport to Val Verde, Matrix manages to kill his guard and jumps from the plane just as it is taking off. 

Knowing that Arius will kill Jenny, regardless of whether or not he does the job, and with approximately 11 hours before the plane is scheduled to land, he sets out after another of Arius' men, Sully. He enlists the aid of an off-duty flight attendant, Cindy, and instructs her to follow Sully to a shopping mall. Cindy first assumes that Matrix is a madman, but after she sees Sully pull a gun on Matrix in the ensuing fight, she decides to assist him in his endeavor. After a lengthy car chase, Matrix catches up with Sully and drops him off a cliff to his death. Taking a motel key from Sully's jacket, Matrix tracks down and confronts Cooke, a former Green Beret in Arius' employ, and impales him on a table leg after a brutal fight.

Afterward, Matrix and Cindy break into a warehouse owned by Arius that supplies weapons for his army, and learn where Jenny is being held after tracing Arius' island base on a map of the coastal region. Matrix breaks into a surplus store to equip himself with military weaponry, but is arrested by the arriving police. Cindy helps him escape by using a rocket launcher on the police car and, after commandeering a seaplane from a nearby marina controlled by Arius, Matrix and Cindy land the plane off the coast of Arius' island hideout. 

Matrix instructs Cindy to contact General Kirby and then proceeds to Arius's villa, killing Arius and his army. Jenny escapes to the villa's basement, but is eventually captured by Bennett. Matrix tracks them down, and after a lengthy fight, Matrix finally kills Bennett by impaling him with a steam pipe. Kirby arrives with a military detachment and asks Matrix to rejoin the unit, but Matrix declines and departs the island aboard the seaplane with Jenny and Cindy, telling Kirby "no chance."

Cast

 Arnold Schwarzenegger as Colonel John Matrix
 Rae Dawn Chong as Cindy
 Alyssa Milano as Jenny Matrix
 Dan Hedaya as President Arius
 Vernon Wells as Captain Bennett
 James Olson as Major General Franklin Kirby
 David Patrick Kelly as "Sully"
 Bill Duke as Cooke
 Drew Snyder as Lawson
 Michael Delano as Forrestal
 Charles Meshack as Henriques
 Carlos Cervantes as Diaz
 Chelsea Field as Brunette Stewardess
 Bill Paxton as Intercept Officer
 Ava Cadell as Girl in Bed at Motel

Production

Development
Writer Jeph Loeb said his original script was about an Israeli soldier who had renounced violence. Steven E. de Souza rewrote the script, tailoring it to Schwarzenegger.

Casting
Vernon Wells was the first choice to be cast as Captain Bennett, mostly because of his role in Mad Max 2 (1981). Mark L. Lester stated that Wells was "the only one that could have played against him [Schwarzenegger]". He further added Bennett was "in love with Matrix but he hated him, too. He wanted to kill him but he was in love with him."

Filming
Principal photography began on April 22, 1985, and wrapped on June 6, 1985 after 45 days of filming. The film was shot on location in California. San Nicolas Island off the coast of Santa Barbara, to which Matrix flies to rescue his daughter, was filmed on the Pacific coast at San Simeon. The barracks that are "attacked" are actually beach properties belonging to the Hearst Castle Estate. The house that Matrix storms at the film's climax was actually the former main residence of the Harold Lloyd Estate in the Benedict Canyon district of Beverly Hills. The car chase scene between Sully and Matrix starts on Ventura Blvd and moves into the hills on Benedict Canyon. The Sherman Oaks Galleria, in Sherman Oaks, California, served as the film's shopping mall location, and was used for six days after 9pm, after stores closed. This film was originally set to cost $8 million, but ended up costing $9 million once filming ended.

Music

Soundtrack 

A soundtrack album was released by Varèse Sarabande on December 2, 2003, as part of the label's CD Club and was limited to 3,000 copies. The score, composed by James Horner, is notable for its prominent use of steel drums and for reusing motifs from Horner's soundtrack for 48 Hours.

 Track listing
 "Prologue/Main Title" – 3:58
 "Ambush and Kidnapping" – 2:35
 "Captured" – 2:14
 "Surprise" – 8:19
 "Sully Runs" – 4:34
 "Moving Jenny" – 3:44
 "Matrix Breaks In" – 3:30
 "Infiltration, Showdown and Finale" – 14:32

La-La Land Records released a limited edition of James Horner's score in August 2011. The release features approximately 62 minutes of music across 24 tracks and includes "We Fight for Love" by The Power Station.

Release

Home media
The first DVD of Commando was released in region 1 in the United States on May 25, 1999. Common with early DVD releases, the disc featured a non-anamorphic video transfer, a basic 2.0 surround track, and only the US theatrical trailer as an extra. DVDs released in other regions soon followed, some with anamorphic transfers, but the 2001 United Kingdom region 2 DVD was censored by the British Board of Film Classification (BBFC), with 12 seconds of cuts to an arm severing and closeups of the impaled Bennett. These cuts were brought over from the 1985 original theatrical release. However, a German master was used for the UK DVD, meaning the film was cut even more than it should have been, leading to 56 seconds of cuts instead of the BBFC's 12 seconds. If the film had been resubmitted to the BBFC, it would be passed uncut under the BBFC's new, more liberal rules. This has proven to be the case as the BBFC's website indicates that both versions of the film (the U.S. theatrical cut and the unrated edition) for the DVD were passed on June 11, 2007. With the unrated edition released, the film is available in its entirety, a first for the UK.

On June 5, 2007, 20th Century Fox officially announced that a completely unedited and unrated director's cut of the film would be released on region 1 DVD on September 18, 2007. Through seamless branching, this disc not only features an unrated cut (which was claimed to run at 95 minutes, but is only 91 minutes, with 92 seconds of extra footage), but as a bonus, also contains the original 90-minute, R-rated US theatrical version. Aside from this, the DVD is a special edition, featuring an audio commentary from director Mark L. Lester (only on the theatrical cut), additional deleted scenes, a Pure Action featurette, a Let Off Some Steam featurette, and four photo galleries with over 150 photos. The transfer is anamorphically enhanced and features a 5.1 audio mix.

In April 2008, the 90-minute theatrical version of the film was released to consumers on the high definition Blu-ray Disc format.

On May 5, 2015, as part of the film's 30th anniversary, the director's cut of Commando was released on Blu-ray Disc in a limited edition, collectible metalpak as a Best Buy exclusive. It contains all of the special features that were included in the 2007 DVD release, including the 90-minute theatrical version of the film.

Reception

Box office
Commando was a box office success grossing over $57.5 million against a $9 million budget. The film debuted at number one on the weekend of October 4–6, 1985 in the United States and spent three consecutive weeks at the top position.

Critical response
Review aggregation website Rotten Tomatoes gives the film a rating of 67% based on reviews from 36 critics, with an average rating of 5.80/10. The website's critical consensus reads, "The ultimate '80s Schwarzenegger movie, replete with a threadbare plot, outsized action, and endless one-liners." On Metacritic, the film has a rating of 51 out of 100, indicating "mixed or average reviews".

D. J. R. Bruckner of The New York Times wrote that "two-thirds of this 90-minute film is mayhem unrelieved by humor and untouched by humanity," and suggested that if sequels were to be made, "more clever writers and subtler directors will have to be found. Even a cinematic comic book needs more artful care than this one was given." Variety wrote, "While it's not in the class of Schwarzenegger's last hit (The Terminator), Commando is actually superior to Rambo: First Blood Part II because of its deft mixture of humor and action (with most of the action brushed with humor) and its deliberate evasion of any political message." Patrick Goldstein of the Los Angeles Times wrote, "Full of spectacular stunts and shootouts, it's a gory crowd-pleaser, directed with jolting efficiency by low-budget veteran Mark L. Lester. If his scenarists had only given Lester a finale with as much explosive punch as his opening scenes, the film could have been a real treat instead of a glorified fireworks display." Gene Siskel of the Chicago Tribune gave the film 2 stars out of 4 and wrote that "Schwarzenegger plays his action scenes both with vengeance and a comic-book laugh, but the mix never gels," adding, "The concluding battle scenes are wimpy by comparison with the action in Rambo. All we see is a half-dozen barracks blown up, shot from four different angles. Wow, look at all of the splintered wood." Paul Attanasio of The Washington Post wrote that the film "starts out fun and ends up dreary—how long can you watch this stony Austrian take target practice?"

Legacy
Commando inspired many other action films, including Strike Commando (1987), Commando Squad (1987), and When Eagles Strike (2003).

Other media

Toys
Diamond Toymakers released a line of action figures in 1986 in an attempt to cash in on the success of G.I. Joe: A Real American Hero. Matrix now leads an elite special forces unit (which replaced his old deceased unit from the original film) called C-Team, made up of Spex, Blaster, and Chopper, against the forces of F.E.A.R., led by Psycho (who is based on the character of Bennett) and consisting of Lead-Head, Stalker, and Sawbones. There was an assortment of 4" figures, containing all of the above, a series of 8" figures, consisting of Matrix, Spex, Blaster, Psycho, Lead-Head, and Stalker. Chopper and Sawbones are absent. Finally, there was an 18" John Matrix that came with a pistol, an M16, and a grenade.

See also

 List of American films of 1985
 Arnold Schwarzenegger filmography

References

External links

 
 
 
 

1985 films
1985 action films
1980s American films
1980s chase films
1980s English-language films
20th Century Fox films
American action films
American chase films
Films about father–daughter relationships
Films about child abduction in the United States
Films about terrorism
Films about United States Army Special Forces
Films directed by Mark L. Lester
Films produced by Joel Silver
Films scored by James Horner
Films set in a fictional country
Films set in Los Angeles
Films set in South America
Films shot in Los Angeles
Films with screenplays by Jeph Loeb
Films with screenplays by Steven E. de Souza
Silver Pictures films